The Legend of Brown Sugar Chivalries, alias Kungfu Macchiato, is a Taiwanese television drama series, broadcast by Star TV in 2008. This show features most members from the Taiwanese music bands, Lollipop, Hey Girl, Choc7, and guest stars actresses Amanda Chou, Carmen Tang, Michelle Zhang, and FanFan.

The characters are mostly based on the stories of Jin Yong (金庸) and Gu Long (古龍).

Media
It is related to the Chinese TV series Swordsman.

Synopsis
This story incorporates the themes of modern wuxia (Chinese martial arts).

In the world of martial arts, there have been legends of many powerful warriors. The strongest to ever walk the Earth are West Side Principal, Chou Da Tong, Tian Shan Tong Lao, and the villain Dongfang Bu Bai, who engaged in a sex change in order to enhance his martial arts skills.

Right now, the four martial arts schools and the world are facing the danger posed by Dongfang Bu Bai. The principal of West Side School gathers the best students from all four schools in hopes to train them into powerful warriors so they can fight against the enemy and restore peace to the world.

On one occasion, their best student, Ling Huchong, encounters the enemy and loses all of his martial skills during the attack. Furthermore, his girlfriend has a change of heart after spending time with the kind-hearted student, Guo Jing. Ling Huchong's cuckolding becomes a distraction and prevents everyone on the team to focus.

Cast

Main cast
Main cast is played at Episode 01- 13
Wang Zi (from Lollipop) as Ling Huchong (令狐聰)
Xiao Xun (from Hey Girl) as Ren Yingying (任瑩瑩)
A-Wei (from Lollipop) as Guo Jing (郭敬)
Ya Tou (from Hey Girl) as Lu Jienning (陸見寧)
Xiao Man (from Hey Girl) as Xiao Long Nǚ (小聾女)
MeiMei(from Hey Girl) as Guardian Saintess (聖女護法)
Ah Ben (from Choc7) as Wei Xiaobao (韋曉寶)
Xiao Yu (from Lollipop) as Chu Liuxiang (楚琉香)
Xao Ma (from Choc7) as I He Cang Tai(伊賀蒼太)
Yeun Fei (from Hey Girl, also from Blackie Beauties) as Shuang Er (霜兒)
Carmen Tang as Lan Feng Huang (藍鳳煌)
Michelle Chang as Little Nurse (小護士)
Hsu Hsiao Shun as Chou Da Tong (周大通)
Vicky Chen as Jin Xiang Yu(金鑲玉)
Johnathan Chang as Lu Dayou (陸大有) [Jienning's Father]

Supporting cast
Support cast is played at 1 - 3 Episode and sometimes appeared in each episodes (1 - 13)

Guest appearances
Hsiao Chieh (from Hey Girl) as Guardian Xie Nǚ (邪女護法)
Ao Quan(from Lollipop) as Hong Shi Ba (洪十八)
Amanda Chou as Tianshan Tong Lao (天山童荖)
Fan Fan (Before see her, voice is B2) as Dongfang Bu Bai (東方不拜)

Additional Cast
Eric Ma as Ren Hantian (任撼天) [Ren Yingying's Father]
 Tan Hsiao Lan 譚筱嵐 as Ren Yingying's mother (任母)
Hsiao Chieh (from Lollipop) as Ronaldo [羅納度] (ep.13)
Wei Lian (from Lollipop) as Beckham [貝克漢] (ep.13)
Da Ya (from Hey Girl) as Guardian of Cult [邪教護法] (ep.13)
Gui Gui (from Hey Girl) as Guardian of Cult [邪教護法] (ep.13)
Apple (from Hey Girl) as Guardian of Cult [邪教護法] (ep.13)

Soundtrack

The Legend of Brown Sugar Chivalries OST (黑糖群俠傳電視原聲帶) was released on October 6, 2008 by Lollipop and Hey Girl under EMI Music. It contains sixteen songs, in which twelve songs are various instrumental versions of the four original songs. The album also includes a DVD. The opening theme song is "The Sutra Chamber" by Lollipop, while the ending theme song is by Wang Chi entitled "Sorry".

Track listing

Production credits
Producer: Ko I Chin
Director: Yu Hua Kuen / Ko Han Chen
Screenwriter: Fang I Te / Tsao Ching Ya

Reference list

External links
 

Taiwanese drama television series
Star Chinese Channel original programming
2008 Taiwanese television series debuts
2008 Taiwanese television series endings
Television shows based on works by Gu Long
Television shows based on works by Jin Yong